"Bad Things" is a song by American rapper and singer Machine Gun Kelly and Cuban-born American singer-songwriter Camila Cabello. The song was released on October 14, 2016, and was produced by The Futuristics. Its music video was directed by Hannah Lux Davis and premiered on December 1, 2016. The song features an interpolation of Fastball's 1999 single "Out of My Head". The single peaked at number four on the US Billboard Hot 100, becoming both Machine Gun Kelly and Cabello's first top ten single as solo artists, as well as the former's only top-ten hit to date.

The song was nominated for Top Rap Collaboration at the 2017 Billboard Music Awards, and won Best Collaboration at the 2017 Radio Disney Music Awards.

Background and composition
During her time as a student at New York University (NYU), American songwriter Madison Love conceived "Bad Things" with several songwriters while she was in a physics class. "Bad Things" is a mid-tempo ballad that interpolates Fastball's 1999 song "Out of My Head". It incorporates lyrical themes of pain-is-pleasure type of love.

Critical reception
Gil Kaufman from Billboard called it an "instant earworm four-minute ode to dark pleasure." For Fuse TV's Bianca Gracie the song shows rapper's "softer side", and highlights Cabello's "delicate vocals". She described the song opens with Cabello "softly crooning" the hook, and MGK then comes in with a "naughty rap flow that cruises over the piano melody." In Idolator, Rachel Sonís described it as a "sleek" ballad with a "dreamy" hook. Time magazine ranked it the fifth worst song of 2016, describing it as a "promising concept" with a "fine" chorus performance from Cabello ruined by the rapper's "milquetoast contribution".

Chart performance
"Bad Things" debuted at number 80 on the US Billboard Hot 100 issued for November 5, 2016. On December 24, 2016, the song moved from number 17 to number 10 and became Kelly's first (and only as of 2022) top-10 entry, and Cabello's first as a soloist, selling 58,000 digital downloads and earning 11.4 million streams. It peaked at number four in its 13th week on the chart and spent 23 weeks in total. The Recording Industry Association of America (RIAA) certified the single 5× platinum, which denotes four million units based on sales and track-equivalent on-demand streams. On the Canadian Hot 100, "Bad Things" peaked at number 11.

The song reached number 22 in Australia and was certified platinum. In New Zealand, it peaked at number 11 and was certified gold. "Bad Things" reached number 16 in the United Kingdom and was certified gold. In Belgium, the song peaked at number 23 and was certified gold. It reached number 47 in Italy and attained a gold certification. "Bad Things" charted within the top 20 of national record charts, at number six in Malaysia, number 13 in the Netherlands, number 14 in Scotland, number 16 in Czech Republic, and number 19 in Finland, Lebanon, Portugal.

Music video
Directed by Hannah Lux Davis, the music video premiered on December 1, 2016, on Vevo. It follows the pair as they lead a somewhat adventurous lifestyle, where they burn trash in barrels, steal, and make out in a barren apartment. MGK is the resident bad boy, getting into fights and racing cars while Cabello stays faithfully by his side. At one point in the video, flashbacks to younger versions of the musicians appear reassuring that their bond really has been unbreakable from the start. MGK and Cabello can be seen enjoying late nights at diners, gathering with friends and getting into trouble all while snuggling and fighting along the way. Their rebellious ways as the pair are chased by police after attempting to steal a car. Stuck at the top of a building with the police hot on their trail and nowhere else to go, the pair decide to die together by committing lover's suicide. As MGK looks longingly at Cabello, the police and their helicopters arrive to apprehend the couple and the lovers join hands and the video ends, leaving the outcome unknown.

As of August 2022, the music video has over 430 million views on YouTube.

Live performances
MGK and Cabello performed the song on The Tonight Show Starring Jimmy Fallon on November 23, 2016, and on December 1, 2016, for The Late Late Show with James Corden. They later performed the song on January 30, 2017, on The Ellen DeGeneres Show following Cabello's exit from girl group Fifth Harmony.

The song was then performed at the 30th Annual Nickelodeon Kids' Choice Awards on Nickelodeon on March 11, 2017.

Cabello also performed her verse as a support act at Taylor Swift's Reputation tour at Wembley Stadium, London on June 23, 2018.

Accolades

Credits and personnel
Credits adapted from the liner notes of bloom.

Publishing
 For Casie Publishing / KOBALT (BMI) // Schweezy Beats Publishing (ASCAP) Artist Publishing Group West (ASCAP) Admin by Warner Chappell // Panic Attack Publishing (ASCAP) / Artist Publishing Group West (ASCAP) / Admin by Warner Chappell // Live Mad Love / Artist Publishing Group West (ASCAP) Admin by Warner Chappell // Sony/ATV Songs, LLC (BMI) // Bible Black c/o The Bicycle Music Company, Inc. (ASCAP).

Recording
 Recorded at Interscope Recording Studios, Santa Monica, California
 Mixed at Larrabee Studios, West Hollywood, California

Personnel

 Machine Gun Kelly – songwriting, lead vocals
 Camila Cabello – songwriting, lead vocals
 The Futuristics – songwriting, production, recording
 Madison Love – songwriting
 Tony Scalzo – songwriting
 Matt Beckley – recording
 Manny Marroquin – mixing

Charts

Weekly charts

Year-end charts

Certifications

References

2010s ballads
2016 singles
2016 songs
Machine Gun Kelly (musician) songs
Camila Cabello songs
Songs written by Machine Gun Kelly (musician)
Songs written by Camila Cabello
Music videos directed by Hannah Lux Davis
Bad Boy Records singles
Interscope Records singles
Torch songs
Songs about suicide
Song recordings produced by the Futuristics
Male–female vocal duets
Songs written by Joe Khajadourian
Songs written by Alex Schwartz
Songs written by Madison Love
Pop ballads
Pop-rap songs